Employees Selection Board (MPESB), popularly known as Vyapam (an abbreviation of its Hindi name Madhya Pradesh Vyavsayik Pariksha Mandal), is a employees selection board of Madhya Pradesh, India. It conducts various tests for admission to professional courses and streams. It is the largest examination conducting body of Madhya Pradesh government and comes directly under the Directorate of Technical Education (Government of Madhya Pradesh). The Madhya Pradesh Employees Selection Board is a self-financed, autonomous incorporated body of State Govt. The Government has re-constituted the Board of Directors for taking decisions on policy and organizational matters through Madhya Pradesh Employees Selection Board Act. 2020.

It was in national news for the Vyapam scam, which was a massive admission and recruitment scam involving politicians, senior officials and businessmen. After the scam was unearthed, 2000 people were arrested, including the state's former education minister Laxmikant Sharma and Vyapam's exam controller Pankaj Trivedi.

Vyapam scam was a massive admission and recruitment scam involving politicians, senior officials and businessmen. Indore Bench of Madhya Pradesh High Court served notices to Vyapam and Medical Council of India (MCI) following a public interest litigation (PIL) filed by parents of some students after reports that more than 300 ineligible candidates managed to get into the merit list. Complaints of irregularities and crooked deals in pre-medical test (PMT) were surfacing since 2009 but in the year 2013, a major scam was unearthed involving several officials and politicians from the state ruling party. The kingpin of the impersonation racket Dr. Jagdish Sagar was arrested and subsequently several other influential people were arrested including ex-Education Minister Laxmikant Sharma, MPPEB's exam controller Pankaj Trivedi, MPPEB's principle system analysts Nitin Mahendra and Ajay Sen and state PMT's examination in-charge C. K. Mishra. The credit to expose the scam goes to Indore-based medical practitioner Dr. Anand Rai.

Establishment
The Madhya Pradesh Professional Examination Board was initially set-up as Pre Medical Test Board by Government of Madhya Pradesh in the year 1970. Later, in the year 1981, Pre Engineering Board was constituted. Soon after, in the year 1982 both these Boards were amalgamated and named as Professional Examination Board (P.E.B.). Professional Examination Board by Govt. Order No.1325-1717-42-82 dated 17.04.1982 has been assigned the responsibility of conducting entrance tests for admission to various colleges in the state

Examinations conducted by Vyapam

Vyapam conducts the following examinations:

 Pre-Polytechnic Test
 Pre-Architecture Test
 Pre-Agriculture Test
 Pre-P.G. Entrance Test
 Pre-M.C.A. Entrance Test
 Management Entrance Test
 Pre-General Nursing Talent Search Test
 B.A., L.L.B. (Hons) Entrance Test
 Pre-BEd Examination
 MPSLET Test
 Police Recruitment Test
 Typing paper Hindi
 Accountant
 Auditor
 General Nursing Training Selection Test (GNTST)
 Pre Nursing Selection test (PNST)
 Pre-veterinary and Fisheries Test (PV & FT)
 Forest Guard

See also 

 Vyapam scam

References

External links
 Official website
 Directorate of Technical Education (Government of Madhya Pradesh)

Education in Madhya Pradesh
School boards in India
Standardised tests in India
Engineering education in India
State agencies of Madhya Pradesh
Corruption in Madhya Pradesh